Brave Tomorrow is an old-time radio soap opera in the United States. It was broadcast on NBC October 11, 1943 – June 30, 1944.

Format
Brave Tomorrow focused on Hal and Louise Lambert and the challenges that they faced while raising daughters Jean and Marty during World War II. A continuing facet of the drama was the older daughter's marriage to a military man who was in training to serve overseas.

Ivory Snow sponsored the 15-minute program.

Personnel
The characters on Brave Tomorrow and the actors who portrayed them are shown in the table below.

Source: Radio Programs, 1924-1984: A Catalog of More Than 1800 Shows except as noted.

Others heard regularly on the program were Ginger Jones, Myra McCormick, Margaret MacDonald and Paul Stewart. Ed Herlihy was the announcer. William Meader provided the music. The writer was Ruth Adams Knight.

See also
 
List of radio soap operas
List of U.S. daytime soap opera ratings
Radio drama

References 

1943 radio programme debuts
1944 radio programme endings
NBC radio programs
American radio soap operas